Stobart Rail may refer to:

 Stobart Rail Freight, a railway freight service operator in the United Kingdom
 XYZ Rail & Civils, (formerly Stobart Rail & Civils), a railway maintenance and infrastructure engineering company in the United Kingdom

See also 
 Eddie Stobart Group
 Esken